Nine is Shankar Mahadevan's second album, in which he explores nine "moods", one in each song.

Track listing
 "O Sahibaa"  (Joy) 
 "Dil Nange Pair Jaise"  (Sadness) 
 "Hum Khoye Khoye Hain"  (Love) 
 "Tezab Ugalta Hai"  (Jealousy) 
 "Maine Ek Khwab Dekha Hai"  (Hope) 
 "Sain Sain Chale Hawa"  (Fear) 
 "Aye Fiza"  (Peace) 
 "Jism Mein Kaise Jaadu"  (Passion) 
 "Jazbaat Ke Sau Rang Hain"  (Jazbaat)

References

External links 
The Shankar Mahadevan Academy

Shankar Mahadevan albums
2007 albums